Shin Yun-bok, better known by his pen name Hyewon (1758–1813), was a Korean painter of the Joseon Dynasty. Like his contemporaries Danwon and Geungjae, he is known for his realistic depictions of daily life in his time. His genre paintings are distinctly more erotic than Danwon's, a fact which contributed to his expulsion from the royal painting institute, Dohwaseo. Painting was frequently a hereditary occupation in the Joseon period, and Hyewon's father and grandfather had both been court painters. Together with Danwon and the later painter Owon, Hyewon is remembered today as one of the "Three Wons" of Joseon-period painting.

Biography
Not much is known about Shin Yun-bok's life. He was the son of royal court painter Hanpyeong (한평; 漢枰), who had participated in painting the royal portraits of Yeongjo and Jeongjo. Hyewon reached the official rank of cheomjeoljesa (첨절제사; 僉節制使) at the Dohwaseo and was adept at different styles of painting; genre, landscape, and animals. It is speculated that he left a great number of paintings due to the popularity of genre paintings during that era.

There are different studies and theories regarding his life, that he may not have ever been a member of the Dohwaseo nor was he on close terms with Kim Hong-do.

Style and legacy
Shin Yun-bok, despite being greatly influenced and overshadowed by Kim Hong-do during his career, developed his own unique technique and artistry. Along with Kim Hong-Do, he is known foremost for his genre paintings of the Joseon era. Whereas Kim depicted everyday life of peasants with a humorous touch, Shin showed glimpses of eroticism in his paintings of townspeople and gisaeng. His choice of characters, composition, and painting method differed from Kim's, with use of bright colors and delicate paint strokes. He also painted scenes of shamanism and townlife, offering insight to lifestyle and costumes of the late Joseon era.

His ink landscape paintings used clear light strokes in a method similar to that of Yun Je-hong (윤제홍), the pioneer in new style painting of the late Joseon era. He is also known to not have used the traditional method of leaving empty space in his paintings, usually filling the whole canvas. Although he placed short verse and his seal on most of his paintings, none indicate the date nor time of their creation and it is difficult to define the progression of his painting style. As one of the pillars of genre painting in the Joseon era, he influenced many other painters afterwards.

His album, Hyewon Pungsokhwacheop, contains 30 of his paintings and was designated the 135th National Treasure of South Korea in 1970.

Famous paintings
Portrait of a Beauty (미인도; 美人圖): Painting on silk. Depicts the standard of traditional beauty in the Joseon era. Realistic details of the hanbok are notable.
Dano day (단오풍정; 端午風情): Painting on paper. Depicts a scene on Dano day; semi-nudes bathing in the stream, a woman in a bright red hanbok rides a swing, two young monks peek in the background.

Gallery

Six paintings from the Yeosokdo Album (여속도첩):

Four paintings from the Pungsokdo Album. See Hyewon pungsokdo for a complete gallery of this album (30 paintings).

Fictional portrayals

Literature
In the novel Painter of the Wind by Lee Jung-myung, Hyewon is portrayed as a woman disguised as a man.

Film and television
 Portrayed by Moon Geun-young and Kim Yoo-jung in the 2008 SBS TV series Painter of the Wind.
 Portrayed by Kim Min-sun in the 2008 film Portrait of a Beauty.

See also
List of Korean painters
Korean painting
Korean art

References

Bibliography

External links
  Brief information about Hyewon from Korean culture figures, Ministry of Culture, Sports and Tourism
 New drama on Joseon's legendary painters from official Korea site, 2008-11-13. Retrieved 2010-07-07.
 Shin Yun-bok in the Spotlight from KBS World, 2008-11-12. Retrieved 2011-02-16.
 Arts of Korea, an exhibition catalog from The Metropolitan Museum of Art Libraries (fully available online as PDF), which contains material on Shin Yun-bok

1758 births
1813 deaths
18th-century Korean painters
19th-century Korean painters